Vector Group Ltd. is an American diversified holding company with two major businesses: Liggett Group LLC (tobacco) and New Valley LLC (real estate), including Douglas Elliman.

Bennett S. LeBow founded Vector Group in 1986. Since then, he has served as Chairman. Howard Lorber has served as the Company's President and Chief Executive Officer since 1994.

Vector Group was previously called Brooke Group.

Holdings

Subsidiaries
Liggett Group LLC - Founded in 1873, Liggett Group LLC is the fourth-largest cigarette manufacturer in the U.S.  Liggett operates in the discount cigarette market. As of March 31, 2019, Liggett's family of brands represented a 14% share of the discount market. Its core brands include: Pyramid, Grand Prix, Liggett Select, Eve and Eagle 20's.  Vector Tobacco Inc. is engaged in the manufacture of conventional cigarettes, based in North Carolina.

New Valley LLC - New Valley LLC (formerly known as Western Union) is a diversified real estate company that acquires or invests in real estate properties or projects.  It has invested in more than 30 real estate projects as of March 31, 2019.

New Valley owns 100 percent of Douglas Elliman Realty, LLC, the largest residential real estate brokerage firm in the New York metropolitan area and fourth-largest residential brokerage firm in the U.S.Other investments
Vector Group also owns a portion of Castle Brands Inc.

Office locations
Vector Group and New Valley's headquarters are in Miami, Florida and they have an additional office in New York, New York.

See also

 List of Florida companies

References

External links
 , the company's official website
 

Holding companies of the United States
Companies based in Miami
American companies established in 1999
Holding companies established in 1999
Companies listed on the New York Stock Exchange